The 15 cm schwere Feldhaubitze M 94 was a heavy howitzer used by Austria-Hungary in World War I. It had a bronze barrel and relied on wheel ramps to absorb its recoil. The barrel was modified in 1899 as the M 99 and can be identified by its octagonal shape. Around the start of the 20th century both the M 94 and M 99 were modified to increase their elevation up to 65°. The elevation arc had to be extended and the trunnion mounts and wheels had to be strengthened to withstand the greater recoil forces when firing at high elevation. They were known as the M 94/4 and the M 99/4 after modification.

Photo Gallery

References
 Ortner, M. Christian. The Austro-Hungarian Artillery From 1867 to 1918: Technology, Organization, and Tactics. Vienna, Verlag Militaria, 2007

See also
 BL 6 inch 30 cwt howitzer : British equivalent
 152 mm howitzer M1910 : French/Russian equivalent

World War I howitzers
World War I artillery of Austria-Hungary
150 mm artillery